Theodoros Papasimakopoulos (Greek: Θεόδωρος Παπασημακόπουλος; 1790 – 1800s) was a Greek revolutionary leader during the Greek War of Independence.

He was born in 1790 in Bostenitsa (now Oreini), northeastern Elis.  He fought on the side of Plaplouta in many battles along with the battle of Lalas, Tripoli, Nafplio and others.  In 1844 he was awarded with the rank of a sergeant by the Greek state.

References
''This article is translated and is based from the article at the Greek Wikipedia (el:Main Page)

1790 births
19th-century deaths
People from Elis
Greek military leaders of the Greek War of Independence